Globidrillia is a genus of sea snails, marine gastropod mollusks in the family Drilliidae.

Previously it was included in the subfamily Clavinae of the family Turridae as a subgenus Elaeocyma (Globidrillia) Woodring, 1928.

This genus includes only bathyal species.

Species
Species within the genus Globidrillia include:
 Globidrillia ferminiana (Dall, 1919)
 Globidrillia hemphillii (Stearns, 1871)
 Globidrillia micans (Hinds, 1843)
 Globidrillia paucistriata (Smith E. A., 1888)
 Globidrillia smirna (Dall, 1881)
 Globidrillia strohbeeni (Hertlein & Strong, 1951)
 † Globidrillia ula Woodring, 1928: (synonym  Clavus (Globidrillia) ulla (Woodring, 1928) )
Species brought into synonymy
 Globidrillia aeolia W.H. Dall, 1919: synonym of  Globidrillia micans (Hinds, 1843)
 Globidrillia aglaophanes R.B. Watson, 1882: synonym of Clionella aglaophanes (R.B. Watson, 1882)

References

 W. P. Woodring. 1928. Miocene Molluscs from Bowden, Jamaica. Part 2: Gastropods and discussion of results. Contributions to the Geology and Palaeontology of the West Indies

External links

 
Gastropod genera